Elaine Ingham is an American microbiologist and soil biology researcher and founder of Soil Foodweb Inc. She is known as a leader in soil microbiology and research of the soil food web, She is an author of the USDA's Soil Biology Primer.

Career 
On 1981, Ingham earned a PhD from the Colorado State University in microbiology with an emphasis in soil. Along with her husband Russ, who has a doctorate in zoology emphasizing nematology, she was offered a post-doctoral fellowship at the Natural Resource Ecology Lab at Colorado State University. In 1985, she accepted a Research Associate Fellowship at the University of Georgia.

In 1986, Ingham moved to Oregon State University and joined the faculty in both Forest Science and Botany and Plant Pathology. She remained on faculty until 2001.

Ingham has been an Affiliate Professor of Sustainable Living at Maharishi University of Management in Fairfield, Iowa, Adjunct Faculty at Southern Cross University in Lismore, New South Wales from 1999 to 2005, Visiting Professor with Melbourne University from 2004 to 2008, and was Program Chair of the Ecological Society of America from 1999 to 2000. She was named chief scientist at The Rodale Institute in 2011 and was later director of research and an instructor at the Agricultural Celebration Institute's farm in California.

She is the founder of Soil Foodweb Inc, which works with soil testing laboratories to assess soil biology.

Selected publications 
 Ingham, E.R. and M. Alms. (1999), The Compost Tea Handbook 1.1
 Ingham, E.R. (2000) The Compost Tea Brewing Manual. Sustainable Studies Institute, Eugene, Oregon. 2nd–5th eds. Soil Foodweb Inc, Corvallis, Oregon.
 Ingham, E. R. (1999). Chapters 1–5 in: The Soil Biology Primer. NRCS Soil Quality Institute, USDA.
 Ingham, E.R. (2004). "The Soil Foodweb: Its Role in Ecosystems Health". In: The Overstory Book: Cultivating Connections with Trees. Ed. Craig R. Elevitch. 2nd ed. Holualoa, Hawaii: Permanent Agriculture Resources.
 Ingham, E.R. and M.D. Slaughter. (2005). "The Soil Foodweb–Soil and Composts As Living Ecosystems". International SoilACE Conference in Soil and Compost Eco-Biology. Leon, Spain. 1: 127-139.

See also
Klebsiella planticola

References

External links
 Soil Foodweb Inc
 Life in the Soil Class by Dr. Elaine Ingham
 Koons, Deborah (2012). Symphony of the Soil, documentary.

Women microbiologists
American microbiologists
Soil biology
Living people
Year of birth missing (living people)